Dehve (also Romanized as  Dehve; also known as Dehve and '''''') is a village in Lishtar Rural District, in the Central District of Gachsaran County, Kohgiluyeh and Boyer-Ahmad Province, Iran. At the 2006 census, its population was 345, in 83 families.

References 

Populated places in Gachsaran County